Windley may refer to:

 Windley, a village in Derbyshire, England
 Windley Key, Florida
 Windley Key Fossil Reef Geological State Park, Florida
 Windley River, New Zealand
 Windley (surname)

See also 
 Windle (disambiguation)